John Coles (July 3, 1926 – December 21, 1997) was an American jazz trumpeter.

Early life
Coles was born in Trenton, New Jersey on July 3, 1926. He grew up in Philadelphia and was self-taught on trumpet.

Later life and career
Coles spent his early career playing with R&B groups, including those of Eddie Vinson (1948–1951), Bull Moose Jackson (1952), and Earl Bostic (1955–1956). He was with James Moody from 1956 to 1958, and played with Gil Evans's orchestra between 1958 and 1964, including for the album Out of the Cool. After this he spent time with Charles Mingus in his sextet which also included Eric Dolphy, Clifford Jordan, Jaki Byard, and Dannie Richmond. Following this he played with Herbie Hancock (1968–1969), Ray Charles (1969–1971), Duke Ellington (1971–1974), Art Blakey (1976), Dameronia, Mingus Dynasty, and the Count Basie Orchestra under the direction of Thad Jones (1985–1986).

In 1985 Coles settled in the San Francisco Bay area; he recorded with Frank Morgan and Chico Freeman the following year. After his return to Philadelphia in 1989 he again worked with Morgan and was part of Gene Harris's Philip Morris Superband. In 1990 he recorded with Charles Earland and Buck Hill. Coles recorded as a leader several times over the course of his career. He died of cancer on December 21, 1997 in Philadelphia.

Discography

As leader
The Warm Sound (Epic, 1961)
Little Johnny C (Blue Note, 1963)
Katumbo (Dance) (Mainstream, 1971)
New Morning (Criss Cross Jazz, 1982)
Two at the Top (Uptown, 1983) with Frank Wess

As sideman
With Geri Allen
Some Aspects of Water (Storyville, 1996)
With Tina Brooks
The Waiting Game (Blue Note, 1961)
With Gil Evans
New Bottle Old Wine (World Pacific, 1958) 
Great Jazz Standards (World Pacific, 1959) 
Out of the Cool (Impulse!, 1960)
The Individualism of Gil Evans (Verve, 1964) 
Blues in Orbit (Enja, 1971)
Where Flamingos Fly (Artists House, 1971 [1981]) 
Bud and Bird (Electric Bird/King, 1986 [1987])
Farewell (Evidence, 1986 [1992])
With Booker Ervin
Booker 'n' Brass (Pacific Jazz, 1967)
With Astrud Gilberto
Look to the Rainbow (Verve, 1966)
With Grant Green
Am I Blue (Blue Note, 1962)
With Herbie Hancock
The Prisoner (Blue Note, 1969) 
Fat Albert Rotunda (Warner Bros., 1969)
With Buck Hill
The Buck Stops Here (Muse, 1992)
With Etta Jones
Christmas with Etta Jones (Muse, 1990)
With Philly Joe Jones Dameronia
To Tadd with Love (Uptown, 1982)
With Charles Mingus
Charles Mingus Sextet with Eric Dolphy Cornell 1964 (Blue Note, 1964 [2007])
Town Hall Concert (Fantasy, 1964)
Revenge! (Revenge, 1964 [1996])
The Great Concert of Charles Mingus (America, 1964)
Hope so Eric Volume 1 Charles Mingus Orchestra, with Eric Dolphy 1964 (Italy: Ingo, 1964)  
With James Moody
Flute 'n the Blues (Argo, 1956)
Moody's Mood for Love (Argo, 1956)
James Moody (Argo, 1959)
Great Day (Argo, 1963)
The Blues and Other Colors (Milestone, 1969)
With Frank Morgan
Bebop Lives! (Contemporary, 1987)
With Horace Parlan
Happy Frame of Mind (Blue Note, 1963; first issued as part of Back from the Gig as by Booker Ervin, 1976)
With Duke Pearson
Hush! (Jazzline, 1962)
Honeybuns (Atlantic, 1965)
Prairie Dog (Atlantic, 1966)
With A. K. Salim
 Stable Mates (Savoy, 1957)
Afro-Soul/Drum Orgy (Prestige, 1965)

References

1926 births
1997 deaths
Musicians from Trenton, New Jersey
American jazz trumpeters
American male trumpeters
Duke Ellington Orchestra members
Blue Note Records artists
20th-century American musicians
American male jazz musicians
Dameronia members
Uptown Records (jazz) artists
20th-century American male musicians
Criss Cross Jazz artists